Artists in Isabey's Studio is a painting of 1798 by the French artist Louis-Léopold Boilly, showing many artists who were influential under the French Directory. It was displayed with 529 other works at the 1798 Paris Salon, which was mainly noted for Gérard's Psyche and Cupid. It is now in the Louvre, whose collections it entered in 1911.

From left to right it shows the composer Étienne Nicolas Méhul, the art critic Hoffman, an unknown man, the sculptor Charles-Louis Corbet, the painters Michel Martin Drolling, Jean-Louis Demarne, Jean-Baptiste Isabey (leaning towards the easel), François Gérard (seated before the easel), Nicolas-Antoine Taunay, Swebach-Desfontaines, the miniature painter Charles Bourgeois, the painter Guillon Lethière, Carle Vernet, the engraver Jean Duplessis-Bertaux, the architects Pierre-François-Léonard Fontaine and Charles Percier, the actor Baptiste aîné of the Comédie-Française (seated by a folio of drawings), the painter and architect Jean-Thomas Thibault, the painters Jan-Frans van Dael and Pierre-Joseph Redouté, the actor François-Joseph Talma, the painters Charles Meynier, Louis-Léopold Boilly himself, the actor Chénard du Théâtre-Italien, the painters Xavier Bidault, Girodet-Trioson (seated and looking at the viewer), the sculptor Denis Chaudet, the engraver Maurice Blot, the sculptor François-Frédéric Lemot, the painter Gioacchino Serangeli and an unknown man.

Bibliography

 
 
 
 

Group portraits by French artists
18th-century portraits
Portrait paintings in the Louvre
Paintings in the Louvre by French artists
French paintings